The Oklahoma Department of Corrections (DOC or ODOC) is an agency of the state of Oklahoma. DOC is responsible for the administration of the state prison system. It has its headquarters in Oklahoma City, across the street from the headquarters of the Oklahoma Department of Public Safety. The Board of Corrections are appointees: five members are appointed by the Governor; two members are appointed by the President Pro Tempore of the Senate; and two members are appointed by the Speaker of the house of Representatives. The board is responsible for setting the policies of the Department, approving the annual budget request, and working with the Director of Corrections on material matters of the agency. T. Hastings Siegfried is the current chairman of the board. The director, who serves at the pleasure of the governor, is the chief executive of the department. The current director of Corrections is Scott Crow, who was appointed after Director Joe Allbaugh resigned his post on June 13, 2019. Crow was confirmed by the Oklahoma State Senate as director in May 2020.

History
Prior to 1908, Oklahoma sent prisoners to the Kansas Penitentiary
in Lansing, Kansas. After a disputed report on the conditions in the Kansas Penitentiary, Oklahoma opened an institution in the former federal jail in McAlester.

On January 10, 1967, Oklahoma created a new state Corrections Department, consisting of a State Board of Corrections, State Director of Corrections, and three divisions: a Division of Institutions, a Division of Probation and Parole, and a Division of Inspection.

In 1973, a three-day riot resulted in the destruction of most of the McAlester facility and the death of three inmates.

In 1976, the first training academy was established in Oklahoma City.

On 29 August 1983, the Dick Conner Correctional Center was hit by a riot that resulted in an inmate death. On 17 December 1985 another riot occurred, this time at the McAlester prison. Five members of staff were taken hostage and three were seriously injured.

On 4 November 2019, the state released more than four hundred inmates who had been convicted of nonviolent crimes. The commutations were expected to save the state over twelve million dollars.

Facilities

As of 2021, the Department of Corrections is responsible for the management, maintenance and security of 23 correctional institutions across the state. Of these facilities, only eight were built originally to serve as prisons.

The execution chamber is located at the Oklahoma State Penitentiary.

State prisons 
 Charles E. Johnson Correctional Center (inmate capacity 600)
 Dick Conner Correctional Center (inmate capacity 1210)
 Dr. Eddie Warrior Correctional Center (inmate capacity 999)
 Howard McLeod Correctional Center (inmate capacity 691)
 Jackie Brannon Correctional Center (inmate capacity 737)
 James Crabtree Correctional Center (inmate capacity 1175)
 Jess Dunn Correctional Center (inmate capacity 1129)
 Jim E. Hamilton Correctional Center (inmate capacity 730)
 John H. Lilley Correctional Center (inmate capacity 836)
 Joseph Harp Correctional Center (inmate capacity 1345)
 Lexington Assessment and Reception Center (inmate capacity 1462)
 Mabel Bassett Correctional Center (inmate capacity 1415)
 Mack Alford Correctional Center (inmate capacity 805)
 North Fork Correctional Facility (inmate capacity 2589)(formerly managed by Corrections Corporation of America)
 Oklahoma State Penitentiary (inmate capacity 838)
 Oklahoma State Reformatory (inmate capacity 1042)
 William S. Key Correctional Center (inmate capacity 1087)

Community Corrections Centers 
 Clara Waters Community Corrections Center (inmate capacity 304)
 Enid Community Corrections Center (inmate capacity 98)
 Lawton Community Corrections Center (inmate capacity 153)
 Northeast Oklahoma Correctional Center (inmate capacity 585)
 Oklahoma City Community Corrections Center (inmate capacity 262)
 Union City Community Corrections Center (inmate capacity 224)

Private Prisons 
 Davis Correctional Center operated by CoreCivic
 Lawton Correctional Facility operated by GEO Group

Halfway Houses 
 Oklahoma City Transitional Center operated by CoreCivic
 Bridgeway, Inc.

Organization

Leadership
The Department of Corrections is under the supervision of the Oklahoma Department of Public Safety.. Under current Governor of Oklahoma Kevin Stitt, Chip Keating is serving as the secretary. The Director of the agency is Scott Crow  and was appointed on June 13, 2019, after the resignation of Joe Allbaugh. Crow was confirmed by the Oklahoma State Senate on May 12, 2020.

The Department of Corrections is governed by the Board of Corrections. The board consists of five members appointed by the Governor, two members each appointed by the President Pro Tempore of the Senate and Speaker of the House of Representatives. Each board member is assigned to one or more of the following committees: Executive, Audit/Finance, Public Policy/Affairs/Criminal Justice, or Population/Security/Private Prisons.

Internal structure
The internal structure of the Oklahoma Department of Corrections is as follows:
 Governor of Oklahoma
 Cabinet Secretary of Public Safety
 Director
 Chief of Staff
 Chief of Operations
 Division of Institutions
 Community Corrections and Contract Services
 Probation & Parole
 Chief of Strategic Engagement
 Communications
 Programs
 Classification & Population
 Chief Financial Officer
 Health Services
 General Counsel
 Inspector General

Divisions
The Department of Corrections is governed by the nine-member Board of Corrections, responsible for establishing and reviewing policies, and confirming the appointment of wardens. The director is appointed by the governor of Oklahoma. As the head of the Department of Corrections, the director supervises, directs, and controls the department. 

 Administrative Services Division - responsible for all financial, budgeting, personnel, purchasing, information technology and administrative management needs of the Department
 Inspector General Division - responsible for conducting and monitoring all international criminal investigations of inmates and Department employees, including fugitive apprehension
 Health and Offender Services Division - responsible for offender programs, offender medical services, offender mental health, offender education, and Departmental staff training
 Community Corrections and Contract Services Division - responsible for the operation of community corrections centers, statewide probation and parole operations, and monitoring private prisons
 Community Sentencing - responsible for the Community Service Sentencing Program and thirty-six statewide planning councils
 Division of Institutions
 Facilities - responsible for seventeen prisons across the state which house male and female prisoners

Hiring
Oklahoma state and United States federal law both place limitations on who can be employed as a correctional officer with the Department. They include any of the following:
 No person who is a registered sex offender
 No person who has been convicted of a crime involving moral turpitude, unless they have received a full pardon for such crime
 No person who has been convicted of any form of felony, unless they have received a full pardon for such felony
 No person who has been convicted of any form of domestic violence, unless they have received a full pardon for such crime
 No person who has been dishonorably discharged from any branch of the Armed Forces of the United States

Budget
The Department of Corrections has annual budget over $500 million. That budget is derived primarily from yearly appropriations, Departmental fees and funds generated by the Prison Industries activities. For Fiscal Year 2014, 88% of the Department's budget comes from yearly appropriations, 6% from the Prison Industries Fund, 4% from the Department's Revolving Fund, and 3% from all other sources.

In late 2017, the department requested more than 1.5 billion dollars, triple its usual budget to make long-delayed improvements.

Fallen Employees
Since the establishment of the Oklahoma Department of Corrections, 22 employees have died in the line of duty.

See also 

 Oklahoma State Penitentiary
 List of United States state correction agencies
 List of law enforcement agencies in Oklahoma

References

External links
 Oklahoma Department of Corrections website

State corrections departments of the United States
Department of Corrections
Penal system in Oklahoma
1967 establishments in Oklahoma
Government agencies established in 1967